Discovery Channel is a Dutch free-to-cable television channel airing in the Netherlands. Its primary target is men aged 25–39. It launched on 12 April 2003.

Cable television is widely available in the Netherlands, and Discovery is available on virtually every platform. It has enjoyed relatively high ratings for several years; in 2018 it had 1.5 percent share of all viewing.

History
Discovery Channel launched in Europe on 1 April 1989.

The localized Dutch feed of Discovery Channel launched on 12 April 2003, replacing the European feed.

The Dutch Discovery Channel distinguishes itself from other versions by having broadcast live sports events. In late November 2008 it broadcast three matches from the Eredivisie that resulted in high ratings. These matches were seen by 805,000 viewers.

In August 2009 the channel switched to the 16:9 widescreen format.

In May 2012 Discovery Networks Benelux launched a HD simulcast of Discovery Channel in the Netherlands, replacing Discovery HD Showcase and was first introduced by UPC Netherlands.

Animal Planet, Eurosport 1, Investigation Discovery and TLC are also widely available. Eurosport 2 and Discovery Science are available as well, but they are only distributed as part of bonus packages.

References

External links
 Discovery NL

Discovery Channel
Television channels in the Netherlands
Television channels and stations established in 2003